Gregory John Mail (born 29 April 1978, Penrith, New South Wales) is an Australian former cricket player, who before his retirement was a batsman for the New South Wales Blues. A tall opening batsman with a solid technique, he debuted for New South Wales in 1999-2000, and was awarded the prestigious Bradman Scholar award in 2000. His most successful season was 2003-04, after which he has struggled to hold a place in the first XI. Of the 12 occasions that a NSW player has carried their bat through a completed First Class innings and the 16 occasions that a player has scored a century in each innings of a First Class match, Mail is the only NSW player in history to have achieved both of these feats during his career.

Greg Mail attended James Ruse Agricultural High School, the top ranking academic school in NSW. Athletically, Mail dominated his academically minded peers, and was rewarded in 1998 with a scholarship from the New South Wales Blues, which enabled him to spend the English summer playing for Northern in the Liverpool Competition.

In 2007 Mail played for Colne in the Lancashire League, finishing the season as the League's highest scorer with 1,198 runs at 79.86.

Mail is the leading run scorer in the history of Sydney First Grade cricket, leapfrogging such talents as Victor Trumper and Bobby Simpson. His season 2001/02 ACB Gold player's card has become a rare collectors item.

In 2011/12 he had a strong Sydney Grade Cricket season, winning the grand final and being named the Captain of the Year after breaking the all-time run scoring record, joining Warren Bardsley and Victor Trumper as scorer of most centuries. He also has represented over half the teams in the comp at some time in his career. Australian Test cricketer Stuart Clark was moved to note "[Greg is] the greatest player ever to play Sydney Grade Cricket." He won the Bill O'Reilly Medal as Sydney Grade Cricket Player of the Year again, and was awarded Sydney Grade Cricket Captain of the Year 2011/12.

Mail has been appointed as a member of the NSW cricket selection panel, whilst simultaneously working in the banking sector.

He has now moved past coaching, having been assistant coach at Sydney Sixers, who won the 2012 CLT20 Champions League. He is believed to be the first coach to have earned more than the star players from the winning bonus pool of USD2.5 million.

See also
 List of New South Wales representative cricketers

References

External links
 Cricinfo Profile

1978 births
Living people
New South Wales cricketers
Cricketers from Sydney
Australian cricketers
People educated at James Ruse Agricultural High School